Alex Liang Wong (born 1974) is an American record producer, multi-instrumentalist (including guitar, piano, drums, and waterphone), and singer-songwriter based in Nashville, Tennessee.

Wong released his first solo studio album, A City on a Lake, in (2012). In 2020, he published his second solo album, The Elephant and the Seahorse. He has written, co-written, produced, and performed on numerous other albums by a variety of artists.

For his engineering contribution to "Aire soy", from Miguel Bosé's 2012 album, Papitwo, Wong received a Latin Grammy nomination.

Career
Wong began his career in 1997 when he joined the Din Pedals. Chosen for his classically trained percussion skills, Wong replaced James Grundler on drums, with Grundler becoming the frontman of the group.

In 2002, Wong formed the Animators with Devon Copley. They released a number of albums and played on the NYC music scene for five years.

Wong went on to form the Paper Raincoat with Amber Rubarth. The band released an EP and a self-titled album, earning a fan following. Paste magazine labeled them "Best of What's Next" in 2010.

Wong has toured extensively with American singer-songwriter Vienna Teng. He co-produced her fourth album, Inland Territory, and co-wrote the song "Antebellum". The record won the ninth annual Independent Music Awards Vox Pop vote for best Folk/Singer-Songwriter Album. Wong also appeared on Teng's fifth album, Aims, singing a duet with her on "The Breaking Light", a song they co-wrote.

In 2011, Wong collaborated with Paul Freeman on a project called Bellows.

Wong has also toured extensively with Ximena Sariñana. She sings on the track "Oceanside" from Wong's debut solo album, A City on a Lake.

Discography

As musician
Solo
 Everyman for Himself (soundtrack – 2006)
 A City on a Lake (2012)
 The Elephant and the Seahorse (2020)

 with the Din Pedals
 The Din Pedals (1998)

with the Animators
 Home by Now (2003)
 The Chamber Sessions (2004)
 How We Fight (2006)

with Deadbeat Darling
 Belle Epoch (2007)
 Weight of Wandering (2009)

with the Paper Raincoat
 Safe in the Sound (2008)
 The Paper Raincoat (2009)

with Vienna Teng
 The Moment Always Vanishing (live album – 2010)

with Bellows
 Relief (2013)

with Jesse Terry
 Kivalina (2019)

As producer
Amber Rubarth
 Something New (2005)
 "Rough Cut" – Unfinished Art (2006)
  "Rough Cut", "In the Creases" – New Green Lines (2008)

Mariana Bell
 Book (2008)

Vienna Teng
 Inland Territory (2009)

Alex Berger
 Snow Globe (2010)

Elizabeth & the Catapult
 "Go Away My Lover" – The Other Side of Zero (2010)

Ari Hest
 Sunset Over Hope Street (2011)

Melissa Ferrick
 "Still Right Here", "Headphones On" – Still Right Here (2011)

Libbie Schrader
 "Diamond Dust" – Magdalene (2011)

Delta Rae
 Carry the Fire (2012)
 The Light (2020)
 The Dark (2021)

Martin Rivas
 Reliquary (2012)

Ximena Sariñana
 "I Want You" – Chimes of Freedom (2012)

Morgan Karr
 Yellow Skies (2013)

Megan Slankard
 Running on Machinery (2014)

Tyler Lyle
 "Ditchdigger", "Hollywood Forever" – The Native Genius of Desert Plains (2015)

Sonia Rao
 Meet Them at the Door (2016)

Sierra Noble
 City of Ghosts (2016) – mixer

Swear and Shake
 "Blouses", "How We Fight" – The Sound of Letting Go (2017)

Rebecca Promitzer
 The Loveliness (2018)

Anne Heaton
 "To the Light", "Hannah" – To the Light (2019)

Seth Glier
 "A Gift", "Somebody Break My Heart" – The Coronation (2021)

References

External links

 
 Alex Wong on Bandcamp
 
 
 The Paper Raincoat

1974 births
American male singer-songwriters
American musicians of Chinese descent
Living people
Singer-songwriters from California
Musicians from Palo Alto, California
American male pop singers
21st-century American singers
21st-century American male singers